Joseph Oladosu-Dosu (born 19 June 1973 in Abuja) is a former football goalkeeper from Nigeria.

Club career
Dosu helped Julius Berger win the Nigerian FA Cup in November 1996, by keeping a clean sheet in the finals against Katsina United. His career came to an abrupt end after a serious car accident in Lagos in 1997, almost left him paralyzed.

After the 1996 Olympics, Dosu signed with Serie A club Reggiana. He never got to make an impact in Italy and was forced to hang his boots at a young age of 23, due to his career ending automobile accident.

International career
He was the only home based player to be included in Nigeria's 1996 Olympic team, where despite being the least experienced of the three goalkeepers ended up as the team's first choice goalkeeper. After winning Gold with the Super Eagles in the 1996 Olympics, he went on to play three more international games for Nigeria. The November 1996 FIFA World Cup qualifiers against Burkina Faso, which the Super Eagles won 2–0 in Lagos. The friendly against Morocco in December 1996, where he kept another clean sheet, and the FIFA World Cup qualifier against Kenya in January 1997. The match against Kenya which ended in a 1–1 draw, was his last game for the Nigeria.

Coaching career
He started his coaching career 2009 as Head coach by Lagos-based Westerlo Football Academy.

Notes 

1973 births
Living people
Nigerian footballers
Nigeria international footballers
Footballers at the 1996 Summer Olympics
Olympic footballers of Nigeria
Olympic gold medalists for Nigeria
Olympic medalists in football
Medalists at the 1996 Summer Olympics
Association football goalkeepers
People from Abuja